Mosharrafeh-ye Kuchak (also Romanized as Mosharrafeh-ye Kūchak, Mosherfeh Kūchek, Mosherfeh-ye Kūchek, and Moshīrafeh-ye Kūchek; also known as Moshirefehé Dow, and Moshrafeh) is a village in Gheyzaniyeh Rural District, in the Central District of Ahvaz County, Khuzestan Province, Iran. At the 2006 census, its population was 86, in 12 families.

References 

Populated places in Ahvaz County